The Rumford Medal is an award bestowed by Britain's Royal Society every alternating year for "an outstandingly important recent discovery in the field of thermal or optical properties of matter made by a scientist working in Europe". 

First awarded during 1800, it was created after a 1796 donation of $5000 by the scientist Benjamin Thompson, known as Count Rumford, and is accompanied by a gift of £1000. Since its inception, the award has been granted to 104 scientists, including Rumford himself during 1800. 

It has been awarded to citizens of the United Kingdom sixty-one times, France fourteen times, Germany eight times, the Netherlands seven times, Sweden four times, the United States three times, Italy twice and once each to citizens of Australia, Hungary, Belgium, Luxembourg and New Zealand.

List of recipients

See also

 List of physics awards

References
General

Specific

Notelist

1796 establishments in Great Britain
Biennial events
Awards of the Royal Society